Niddah is a masekhet or tractate of the Mishnah and the Talmud, and is part of the order of Tohorot. The content of the tractate primarily deals with the legal provisions related to Halakha of Niddah.

In Judaism, a niddah is a woman during menstruation, or a woman who has menstruated and not yet completed the associated requirement of immersion in a mikveh (ritual bath). In the Book of Leviticus, the Torah prohibits sexual intercourse with a niddah. The prohibition has been maintained in traditional Jewish law.  The laws concerning niddah are also referred to as taharat hamishpacha (Hebrew for family purity).

Niddah, along with Eruvin and Yevamot, is considered one of the three most difficult tractates in the Babylonian Talmud. A Hebrew mnemonic for the three is עני (ani, meaning "poverty").

Structure 
Niddah consists of 10 chapters. It has 79 mishnahs and 73 pages gemara.

Chapter headings 
 Shammai Omer
 Hol Ka'yad
 Hamapelet Chatichah
 Bnot Kutim
 Yotzei Dofen
 Ba Siman
 Dan Niddah
 Haroeh Kettem
 Haisha Shehi Oseh
 Tinoket

See also 
 Ritual purity in Judaism

References 

Mishnah
Talmud